Pacman dysplasia  is a lethal autosomal recessive skeletal dysplasia.  The dysplasia is present during fetal development.

References

External links 

 

Skeletal disorders